Ballık (literally "honeypot") is a Turkish place name that may refer to the following places in Turkey:

 Ballık, Altınyayla
 Ballık, Kastamonu, a village in the district of Kastamonu, Kastamonu Province
 Ballık, Sandıklı, a village in the district of Sandıklı, Afyonkarahisar Province